The Abbeville Sluggers were a minor league baseball team, based in Abbeville, Louisiana that played in the Louisiana State League in 1920.

External links
Baseball Reference

Louisiana State Baseball League teams
Defunct minor league baseball teams
Professional baseball teams in Louisiana
Sluggers
1920 establishments in Louisiana
Defunct baseball teams in Louisiana